Hyalesthes obsoletus is a bug species in the genus Hyalesthes.

H. obsoletus is the vector of the black wood disease of grapevine.

References

Insect vectors of plant pathogens
Insects described in 1865
Cixiidae